The Fighting Vigilantes is a 1947 American Western film directed by Ray Taylor and written by Robert B. Churchill. The film stars Lash LaRue, Al St. John, Jennifer Holt, George Chesebro, Lee Morgan, Marshall Reed, Carl Mathews and Russell Arms. The film was released on November 15, 1947, by Producers Releasing Corporation.

Plot

Cast          
Lash LaRue as Marshal Cheyenne Davis
Al St. John as Fuzzy Q. Jones 
Jennifer Holt as Abby Jackson
George Chesebro as Price Taylor
Lee Morgan as Sheriff
Marshall Reed as Chick
Carl Mathews as Shanks
Russell Arms as Trippler
Steve Clark as Frank Jackson
John Elliott as Bert
Felice Richmond as Ellie

References

External links
 

1947 films
American Western (genre) films
1947 Western (genre) films
Producers Releasing Corporation films
Films directed by Ray Taylor
American black-and-white films
1940s English-language films
1940s American films